Argema is a genus of moths from the family Saturniidae, commonly known as moon moths.  They are distinguished by long tails on their hindwings.

Species
Argema besanti (Rebel, 1895)
Argema fournieri (Darge, 1971)
Argema kuhnei (Pinhey, 1969)
Argema mimosae (Boisduval, 1847)
Argema mittrei (Guerin-Meneville, 1846)

References

Encyclopedia of Life

 
Moth genera